Wynns Mill is an extinct town in Henry County, in the U.S. state of Georgia.

History
The community was named after J.A. C. Wynn, proprietor of a local gristmill and sawmill. A post office called Wynn's Mill was established in 1877, and remained in operation until 1895.

References

Geography of Henry County, Georgia
Ghost towns in Georgia (U.S. state)